

FTP Voyager
FTP Voyager is an FTP/FTPS/SFTP client for Microsoft Windows with support for the following features:

FTP/FTPS/SFTP protocols
Directory synchronization
Use of multiple file transfer threads
File searching
Custom FTP commands
File transfer queueing with up to 9 transfer threads
Proxy server support
Customizable ribbon interface
Automatic name conversion during transfers
"Live" file editing
ZLIB compression
Multiple concurrent local/remote browsers
Native IPv6 support
Native 64-bit system support

FTP Voyager Scheduler
FTP Voyager includes a component called FTP Voyager Scheduler which allows for various actions to be scheduled:

Uploads
Downloads
Synchronizations (Local/Remote)
File move operations (move up, move down)
External batch operations

History
FTP Voyager began as an ActiveX project by Mark Peterson known as "FTPTree". Originally intended to work as an in-browser FTP client, it developed into an independent graphical application to fill the need to be able to use FTP as easily as Windows Explorer. It was first released in January 1997, and quickly took on the appearance of the Windows 95 Windows Explorer. Ongoing development has added features like synchronization, customizable UI, FTP Voyager Scheduler, thumbnail support and more.

In 2012, FTP Voyager released version 16, which added IPv6 support, 64-bit support, and more. The new release incorporated a redesign of the transfer engine that also massively improved transfer performance, and enables it to better support modern system hardware and utilize it with greater efficiency.

FTP Voyager was the winner of the Software Industry's "Best Internet Enhancement" award from 2000-2007 and again in 2010.

FTP Voyager v16 was released as a free product when SolarWinds purchased Rhinosoft on Dec. 18, 2012.

See also 
Comparison of FTP client software

External links
Official website

FTP clients